Sir Shridath Surendranath Ramphal  (born 3 October 1928), often known as Sir Sonny Ramphal, is a Guyanese politician who was the second Commonwealth Secretary-General, holding the position from 1975 to 1990. He was also the foreign minister of Guyana from 1972 to 1975, and assistant attorney general of the West Indies Federation from 1958 to 1962.

Shridath Ramphal is an Earth Charter International Commission member.

Biography

Ramphal was born in New Amsterdam, British Guiana, to an Indo-Guyanese family. After attending schools in Georgetown, Ramphal studied law at King's College London, graduating with LL.B. and LL.M. degrees. He was called to the bar at Gray's Inn in London in 1951. As a pupil barrister he worked with the British politician and lawyer Dingle Foot. Ramphal continued studying law for a year at Harvard Law School in the US on a 1962 Guggenheim Fellowship.

Ramphal started his legal career as a Crown Counsel in the Attorney-General's Office in 1953, becoming Solicitor-General and then Assistant Attorney-General of the short-lived West Indies Federation. After a period in private practice in Jamaica, he returned to British Guiana in 1965 to be the Attorney General. Two years later, he was also appointed Minister of State in the Ministry of External Affairs, later becoming Minister of Justice (from 1973) and Minister of Foreign Affairs (from 1972). In 1975, he left Guyana to become Commonwealth Secretary-General.

He also served as the Chancellor of the University of Warwick from 1989 to 2002, at the University of the West Indies from 1989 to 2003, and at the University of Guyana from 1990 to 1992.

During Ramphal's time as Commonwealth Secretary-General, the United Kingdom represented by Margaret Thatcher was found to be in a minority of one on the issue of economic sanctions against apartheid South Africa.

With Ingvar Carlsson, he was in 1995 one of the co-chairs of the Commission on Global Governance, which reported on issues of international development, international security, globalization and global governance.

Selected bibliography

 Inseparable Humanity: An Anthology of Reflections (Hansib, 1988)
 Triumph for UNCLOS: The Guyana-Suriname Maritime Arbitration (Hansib, 2008)
 Caribbean Challenges: Sir Shridath Ramphal's Collected Counsel (Hansib, 2012)

Honours and awards

Sir Shridath was appointed a Companion of the Order of St Michael and St George (CMG) in the 1966 Birthday Honours (the list was dated to 25 May of that year). He was knighted in the 1970 New Year Honours, and invested with his knighthood by the Queen at Buckingham Palace on 3 February. He was appointed a Knight Grand Cross of the Order of St. Michael and St. George (GCMG) in 1990.

On 26 February 1982, Sir Shridath was appointed an honorary Companion of the Order of Australia (AC). On 6 February 1990, Ramphal was the 19th appointee to the Order of New Zealand, New Zealand's highest civil honour. He was decorated as a Member of the Order of the Caribbean Community (OCC) in the first conferment in 1992. In May 2006 Ramphal was appointed an Honorary Fellow of Royal Society of Arts. He is a vice-president of the Royal Commonwealth Society. The Ramphal Building at the University of Warwick was named in his honour.

In 2002, Rampal was awarded the Indira Gandhi Peace Prize.

Popular culture

Ramphal is portrayed by Tony Jayawardena in the fourth season of the Netflix web television series The Crown.

Further reading

 Richard Bourne, Shridath Ramphal: The Commonwealth and the World (Hansib, 2009)

References

External links

Transcript of the interview, part one
Transcript of the interview, part two
The Ramphal Institute - Official website for the continuation of the work of Sir Shridath Ramphal: promoting good governance, economic development and social justice around the world.

1928 births
Living people
Alumni of King's College London
British colonial attorneys general in the Americas
Chancellors of the University of Warwick
Commonwealth Secretaries-General
Fellows of King's College London
Foreign ministers of Guyana
Guyanese diplomats
Guyanese knights
Guyanese Queen's Counsel
20th-century King's Counsel
Guyanese politicians of Indian descent
Harvard Law School alumni
Honorary Fellows of the London School of Economics
Justice ministers of Guyana
Knights Bachelor
Members of Gray's Inn
People from New Amsterdam, Guyana
Presidents of the International Union for Conservation of Nature
Recipients of Pravasi Bharatiya Samman
Recipients of the Order of the Companions of O. R. Tambo